The North Carolina General Assembly of 1783 was the state legislature that convened in Hillsboro, North Carolina from April 18, 1783, to May 17, 1783.  Members of the North Carolina Senate and the North Carolina House of Commons were elected by eligible North Carolina voters.  This was the last assembly to meet during the American Revolution.  Much of their time was devoted to taking care of the North Carolina soldiers that fought in the war.

The General Assembly elected Alexander Martin of Guilford County as governor on April 26, 1782.  James Glasgow was Secretary of State.  James Iredell was Attorney General.  There  was no Lieutenant Governor of North Carolina until 1868.

Councilors of State

The General Assembly elected the following Councilors of State on May 9, 1783:
 James Saunders from Caswell County 
 Nathaniel Macon from Warren County Warren 
 Spruce Macay from Rowan County
 Philemon Hawkins II from Warren County 
 Thomas Polk from Mecklenburg County
 Robert Burton from Granville County
 Marquis de Bretigny from Craven County

Members

There was one senator and two members of the House of Commons for each of the 50 counties.  In addition, each of the six districts had one representative each.  The House of Commons leadership and staff included:  Edward Starkey, Speaker; John Hunt, Clerk; and John Haywood, Assistant Clerk.  The Senate leadership and staff included:  Richard Caswell, speaker; John Haywood, clerk; and Sherwood Haywood, assistant cleark.  Members of the House of Commons and Senate are listed below for each county and district.

Legislation

The American Revolution was ending, so much of the session was devoted to enacting legislation to compensate soldiers.  There were also act to name an agent for dealing with the Cherokees, dealing with slaves, monetary policy, and an act dealing with pardoning some loyalists (not David Fanning).  The town of Fayetteville was authorized by the assembly.  Martin Academy (later changed to Washington College) in Washington County was chartered by the assembly.

The territory of North Carolina extended to the Mississippi River in 1783.  The General Assembly established Greene and Davidson Counties in the western region of North Carolina that eventually would become Tennessee in 1796.

Notes

References

1783
General Assembly
 1783
 1783